The Col. Joseph Ellis House is located at 1009 Sycamore Street in Haddon Heights, Camden County, New Jersey, United States. The house was built in 1760, and was the dwelling of Revolutionary War hero Colonel Joseph Ellis.  It was added to the National Register of Historic Places on September 23, 1994, for its significance in architecture and military history. It is part of the Haddon Heights Pre-Revolutionary Houses Multiple Property Submission (MPS)

History
The Col. Joseph Ellis House derives primary significance as the residence of Joseph Ellis (d. 1796), a political officeholder and important commander of local militia during the American Revolution. Born in Ellisburg, Gloucester (now Camden) County, Ellis married Mary, daughter of Jacob Hinchman, in 1760. The couple lived in this house.

The house stands on land that belonged to John Hinchman, Sr., then, after his death, to Jacob Hinchman his youngest son.

See also
National Register of Historic Places listings in Camden County, New Jersey
Haddon Heights, New Jersey
Hinchman-Lippincott House

References

Houses completed in 1760
Houses on the National Register of Historic Places in New Jersey
Houses in Camden County, New Jersey
National Register of Historic Places in Camden County, New Jersey
Georgian architecture in New Jersey
Haddon Heights, New Jersey
New Jersey Register of Historic Places
1760 establishments in New Jersey